Chalermwong Udomna (formerly Prakob Udomna (ประกอบ อุดมนา)), who boxes as Poonsawat Kratingdaenggym, (พูนสวัสดิ์ กระทิงแดงยิม; born 20 November 1980) is a retired professional boxer from Thailand who fought in the Super bantamweight (also known as Junior featherweight) division. He is a former WBA Regular Bantamweight and Super Bantamweight World Champion, and a former PABA regional Bantamweight and Superbantamweight. His manager is Niwat Laosuwanwat who is the manager of the former WBA Junior bantamweight World Champion and legendary Thai boxer Khaosai Galaxy.

On 26 September 2009 Poonsawat defeated Irish boxer Bernard Dunne in the 3rd round to claim the WBA World Super Bantamweight title. Then Poonsawat defended his title two more times until May 2010.

On 2 October 2010 Poonsawat lost to Ryol Li Lee in a stunning upset. This was Kratingdaenggym's first loss since July 2006 against Volodymyr Sydorenko.

Poonsawat was due to fight Guillermo Rigondeaux of Cuba in an attempt to regain the WBA Super Bantamweight title. However, on December 14, 2012, after Olympic-style drug testing, it was revealed that Poonsawat had failed a medical exam, and would not be able to participate in the bout.  Rumors came about that Poonsawat had tested positive for HIV, but it was later revealed that he suffers from thalassemia, an affliction that affects red blood cells and causes anemia.  Due to this, his boxing career has ended.

See also 
List of WBA world champions
List of super bantamweight boxing champions

References

External links
 

|-

|-

Living people
1980 births
World Boxing Association champions
Super-bantamweight boxers
Bantamweight boxers
World super-bantamweight boxing champions
World boxing champions
Poonsawat Kratingdaenggym
Poonsawat Kratingdaenggym